Alejandro Hannig (21 October 1897 – 17 February 1987) was a Chilean sprinter. He competed in the men's 200 metres at the 1928 Summer Olympics.

References

1897 births
1987 deaths
Athletes (track and field) at the 1928 Summer Olympics
Chilean male sprinters
Olympic athletes of Chile
Sportspeople from Concepción, Chile
20th-century Chilean people